Sydney Wilfred Hastings Phillips (27 May 1874 – 25 August 1960) was an Australian rules footballer who played with St Kilda in the Victorian Football League (VFL).

After six years with St Kilda (spanning the time when they entered the VFL), Phillips took a role with the Perth Mint in late 1898 and moved to Western Australia where he was captain of the Perth Football Club for a few years. He later took up lawn bowls and became a state champion of both Victoria and Western Australia.

References

External links 

1874 births
1960 deaths
Australian rules footballers from Victoria (Australia)
St Kilda Football Club players
Perth Football Club players
Australian male bowls players